Tatton may refer to:

 Tatton (UK Parliament constituency), a constituency in Cheshire, England, represented in the United Kingdom House of Commons
 Tatton Park, a country estate in Cheshire, which includes 
 Tatton Hall 
 Tatton Old Hall 
 Tatton Park Gardens
 Tatton, Cheshire, a civil parish in Cheshire East, largely contained within Tatton Park
 Tatton, New South Wales, a suburb of Wagga Wagga, New South Wales, Australia
 Tatton Park Flower Show, an annual flower show held by the Royal Horticultural Society